Pericentrin (kendrin), also known as PCNT and pericentrin-B (PCNTB), is a protein which in humans is encoded by the PCNT gene on chromosome 21. This protein localizes to the centrosome and recruits proteins to the pericentriolar matrix (PCM) to ensure proper centrosome and mitotic spindle formation, and thus, uninterrupted cell cycle progression. This gene is implicated in many diseases and disorders, including congenital disorders such as microcephalic osteodysplastic primordial dwarfism type II (MOPDII) and Seckel syndrome.

Structure 

PCNT is a 360 kDa protein which contains a series of coiled coil domains and a highly conserved PCM targeting motif called the PACT domain near its C-terminus. The PACT domain is responsible for targeting the protein to the centrosomes and attaching it to the centriole walls during interphase. In addition, PCNT possesses five nuclear export sequences which all contribute to its nuclear export into the cytoplasm, as well as one nuclear localization signal composed of three clusters of basic amino acids, all of which contribute to the protein's nuclear localization.

PCNTB, a cDNA homolog of PCNT, was identified and described by Li et al. to share a sequence identity of 61% and similarity of 75%. However, compared to PCNT, PCNTB contains an additional coiled coil domain and unique 1000-residue C-terminus, suggesting that these two may be separate proteins in a new CPM superfamily. As with PCNT, the C-terminus of PCNTB contains functional domains for centriole localization and CEP215 binding. The N-terminus may also contain a functional domain that associates with the C-terminus domain, and this association is required for engagement with the centriole.

Function 

The protein encoded by this gene is expressed in the cytoplasm and centrosome throughout the cell cycle, and to a lesser extent, in the nucleus. It is an integral component of the PCM, which is a centrosome scaffold that anchors microtubule nucleating complexes and other centrosomal proteins. In one model, PCNT complexes with CEP215 and is phosphorylated by PLK1, leading to PCM component recruitment and organization, centrosome maturation, and spindle formation. The protein controls the nucleation of microtubules by interacting with the microtubule nucleation component γ-tubulin, thus anchoring the γ-tubulin ring complex to the centrosome, which is essential for bipolar spindle formation and chromosome assembly in early mitosis. This ensures normal function and organization of the centrosomes, mitotic spindles, and cytoskeleton, and by extension, regulation over cell cycle progression and checkpoints. Downregulation of PCNT disrupted mitotic checkpoints and arrested the cell at the G2/M checkpoint, leading to cell death. Moreover, microtubule functioning was also disrupted, resulting in mono- or multipolar spindles, chromosomal misalignment, premature sister chromatid separation, and aneuploidy.

PCNT is highly abundant in skeletal muscle, indicating that it may be involved in muscle insulin action. PCNT is also involved in neuronal development through its interaction with DISC1 to regulate microtubule organization.

Clinical significance 

Mutations in the PCNT gene have been linked to Down syndrome (DS); two types of primordial dwarfism, MOPDII and Seckel syndrome; intrauterine growth retardation; cardiomyopathy; early onset type 2 diabetes; chronic myeloid leukemia (CML); bipolar affective disorder; and other congenital disorders. In particular, the short stature and small brain size characteristic of MOPDII and Seckel syndrome have been attributed to centrosome dysfunction and cell growth disruption as a result of PCNT malfunction. Additionally, premature aging, cerebral involution, inflammatory and immune responses are linked to DS associated with PCNT mutations, while severe insulin resistance, diabetes, and dyslipidemia are featured in MOPDII associated with PCNT mutations.

Interactions 
PCNT has been shown to interact with: 
calmodulin,
separase,
CEP215,
CHD3/4,
protein kinase A, 
protein kinase C,
DISC1,
γ-tubulin complex proteins, and 
PCM1.

References

Further reading